Eagris is a genus of skippers in the family Hesperiidae.

Species
Eagris decastigma Mabille, 1891
Eagris denuba (Plötz, 1879)
Eagris hereus (Druce, 1875)
Eagris lucetia (Hewitson, 1875)
Eagris nottoana (Wallengren, 1857)
Eagris sabadius (Gray, 1832)
Eagris subalbida (Holland, 1893)
Eagris tetrastigma (Mabille, 1891)
Eagris tigris Evans, 1937

References

External links
Natural History Museum Lepidoptera genus database
 Seitz, A. Die Gross-Schmetterlinge der Erde 13: Die Afrikanischen Tagfalter. Plate XIII 76

Tagiadini
Hesperiidae genera
Taxa named by Achille Guenée